The LIWA Heights is a 41-floor tower part of the Jumeirah Lake Towers in Dubai, United Arab Emirates. The tower has a total structural height of 148 m (486 ft).  Construction of the LIWA Heights was completed in 2008.

See also 
 List of tallest buildings in Dubai
 List of buildings in Dubai

External links

Emporis

Residential skyscrapers in Dubai